Qualifying standards for the 2005 World Championships in Athletics can be found here - 

2005 World Championships in Athletics